Hayle South was an electoral division of Cornwall in the United Kingdom which returned one member to sit on Cornwall Council between 2009 and 2021. It was abolished at the 2021 local elections, being succeeded by Gwinear-Gwithian and Hayle East and Hayle West.

A ward of the same name returned one member to Cornwall County Council between 1985 and 2005, when it was merged into the Hayle-Gwinear-Gwithian division.

Cornwall Council division

Councillors

Extent
Hayle South covered the south of the town of Hayle, bordering the Hayle Estuary, and included the suburb of Foundry, part of the suburb of Copperhouse (most of which was covered by the Hayle North division), and the village of Angarrack. The division was minorly affected by boundary changes at the 2013 election. Before boundary changes, the division covered 860 hectares in total; after, it covered 861 hectares.

Election results

2017 election

2013 election

2009 election

Cornwall County Council division

Councillors

Election results

2001 election

1997 election

1993 election

1989 election

1985 election

Notes

References

Hayle
Electoral divisions of Cornwall Council